Tang Jiuhong (born February 14, 1969) is a former Chinese badminton star who was one of the world's leading women's singles players of the late 1980s and early 1990s.

Career 
She won the then biennial 1991 World Championship in 1991 and was a semifinalist in the 1989 World Championships and 1993 World Championships competitions. She was a bronze medalist in women's singles at the 1992 Summer Olympics. Her international singles titles included the prestigious All England Championship in 1992, as well as the Belgian (1988), Thailand (1989), Danish (1989, 1990), Swiss (1989), Singapore (1990), Korean (1992), and Swedish Opens (1992); the World Badminton Grand Prix in 1989, the quadrennial Asian Games in 1990, and the Badminton World Cup in 1992. Tang played on Chinese Uber Cup (women's international) teams that won world team titles in 1990 and 1992. In the late 1980s Tang and her fellow countrywoman Huang Hua were touted by some to be China's next generation of dominant female singles players, taking over from Li Lingwei and Han Aiping. Within a few years, however, they were upstaged by an even younger group of precocious badminton talents that included Indonesia's Susi Susanti, South Korea's Bang Soo-hyun, and China's own Ye Zhaoying.

Tang Jiuhong was brought up in Hunan by her elder brother Hui Tang and in effect his love of badminton introduced her to the sport. The badminton coach of the school where Hui Tang was training was impressed by his little 5-year-old sister Tang Jiuhong. He found that the tall girl's athleticism well suited for badminton. Soon little "Red Nine" as her nickname would become, was part of the County Amateur Sports School team. Four years later she was on the Hunan province badminton team. She won the National Youth Badminton Competition for three consecutive years in the women's singles event. She soon delivered more remarkable achievements winning the 1988 women's singles title at the National Badminton Championships. At the peak of her career she won 14 open events in one year, but her success also came at a price. Maintaining such high strength training for a long time led to severe physical discomfort. In 1992 when she was part of the winning Chinese Uber Cup team (her second Uber Cup title) she also had severe hematuria. To prepare for the Olympic Games, her coach arranged a base in the Beijing Miyun Reservoir where she could be nursed for a month, but the subsequent training still affected her health. The hematuria reappeared and affected her play at the 1992 Barcelona Olympic Games where she managed to reach the semifinals and earn a bronze medal. As  pre-event favorite for the gold medal, however, her lopsided loss to Korean player Bang Soo-hyun received such negative criticism in China that she considered immediately retiring. But the Hunan Province Sports Bureau insisted that she persevere and after a period of rest her body eventually recovered. In 1993 she took another bronze medal at the individual world championships, again losing to Bang Soo-hyun but in an extremely close match. After winning women's singles at the Chinese national championships once more in 1993 Tang retired. In 1994 the Hunan Province government awarded her the title of "Most Outstanding Woman".

Achievements

Olympic Games 
Women's singles

World Championships 
Women's singles

World Cup 
Women's singles

Asian Games 
Women's singles

Asian Cup 
Women's singles

IBF World Grand Prix 
The World Badminton Grand Prix sanctioned by International Badminton Federation (IBF) from 1983 to 2006.

Women's singles

Women's doubles

Invitational tournament 
Women's singles

Personal life 
After her retirement Tang Jiuhong opened up a restaurant in her hometown of Hunan, and later also opened some branches in Beijing.
In 1996, Tang Jiuhong emigrated to the United States, but soon returned to China, with her husband and child settling in Beijing. Later, because she could not adapt to the weather in Beijing, she returned to Hunan. She was then invited to act as secretary and director of the badminton management center which was established in the Hunan province, and began to engage in her sports management work. At the beginning of 2002, the Hunan Provincial Sports Bureau appointed Tang Jiuhong to the Yiyang City and she became the Chaoyang District deputy mayor, as a grass-roots testing exercise. Later she was promoted to deputy director of the Hunan Provincial Sports Bureau, and she was elected to the National People's congress.

References

External links 

 
 
 
 
 

1969 births
Living people
Badminton players from Hunan
Badminton players at the 1992 Summer Olympics
Olympic badminton players of China
Olympic bronze medalists for China
Olympic medalists in badminton
Asian Games medalists in badminton
People from Yiyang
People's Republic of China politicians from Hunan
Chinese female badminton players
Badminton players at the 1994 Asian Games
Badminton players at the 1990 Asian Games
Medalists at the 1992 Summer Olympics
Asian Games gold medalists for China
Asian Games bronze medalists for China
Medalists at the 1990 Asian Games
Medalists at the 1994 Asian Games
World No. 1 badminton players
20th-century Chinese women